Probable ATP-dependent RNA helicase DDX11 is an enzyme that in humans is encoded by the DDX11 gene.

DEAD box proteins, characterized by the conserved motif Asp-Glu-Ala-Asp (DEAD), are putative RNA helicases. They are implicated in a number of cellular processes involving alteration of RNA secondary structure such as translation initiation, nuclear and mitochondrial splicing, and ribosome and spliceosome assembly. 
Based on their distribution patterns, some members of this family are believed to be involved in embryogenesis, spermatogenesis, and cellular growth and division. This gene encodes a DEAD box protein, which is an enzyme that possesses both ATPase and DNA helicase activities. This gene is a homolog of the yeast CHL1 gene, and may function to maintain chromosome transmission fidelity and genome stability. Alternative splicing results in multiple transcript variants encoding distinct isoforms.

References

Further reading